Norman Riley (9 April 1894 – 2 October 1960) was an Australian cricketer. He played in one first-class match for South Australia in 1925/26.

See also
 List of South Australian representative cricketers

References

External links
 

1894 births
1960 deaths
Australian cricketers
South Australia cricketers
Cricketers from Adelaide